Phyllodesmium macphersonae is a species of sea slug, an aeolid nudibranch, a marine gastropod mollusc in the family Facelinidae.

Distribution 
The distribution of Phyllodesmium macphersonae includes Australia, Tanzania and Japan.

Description 
The length of the slug is 4–35 mm. This species contains zooxanthellae.

Ecology 
Phyllodesmium macphersonae feeds on an octocoral.

References

External links
  Burn R. (2006) A checklist and bibliography of the Opisthobranchia (Mollusca: Gastropoda) of Victoria and the Bass Strait area, south-eastern Australia. Museum Victoria Science Reports 10:1–42

Facelinidae
Gastropods described in 1962